During the weeks leading up to the 2020 Polish presidential election, various organizations carry out opinion polling to gauge voters' intentions in Poland. Results of such polls are displayed in this article.

The date range for these opinion polls are from the previous presidential election, held on 24 May 2015, to election day.

First round 

 
</onlyinclude>

Pre-2020 opinion polls

Second round
Duda v. Trzaskowski
</onlyinclude>
</onlyinclude>
</onlyinclude>
</onlyinclude>
</onlyinclude>
</onlyinclude>

Pre-first round polls

Duda v. Hołownia
</onlyinclude>
</onlyinclude>
</onlyinclude>
</onlyinclude>
</onlyinclude>
</onlyinclude>

Duda v. Kosiniak-Kamysz
</onlyinclude>
</onlyinclude>
</onlyinclude>
</onlyinclude>
</onlyinclude>
</onlyinclude>

Duda v. Biedroń
</onlyinclude>
</onlyinclude>
</onlyinclude>
</onlyinclude>
</onlyinclude>
</onlyinclude>

Duda v. Bosak
</onlyinclude>
</onlyinclude>
</onlyinclude>
</onlyinclude>
</onlyinclude>
</onlyinclude>

Duda v. Kidawa-Błońska

Duda v. Tusk

Duda v. Kukiz

Duda v. Petru

Duda v. Schetyna

Duda v. Sikorski

Duda v. Nowacka

Kaczyński v. Tusk

Notes

References

2020